Elizabeth Frances Rigby (born 19 February 1976) is a British journalist. She has worked for Sky News since 2016 and became its political editor in 2019. She has previously worked as a newspaper journalist for the Financial Times and The Times.

Early life and education
Rigby was born in Colchester, Essex, UK. She grew up in Buckinghamshire, and attended Beaconsfield High School, a girls' grammar school. Her father was a businessman and her mother was a headteacher. Rigby graduated with a first in social and political science from Fitzwilliam College, Cambridge. She went on to gain a master's degree in economics and development studies from the Institute of Latin American Studies at the University of London.

Career
After graduation, Rigby spent a period of time teaching English in Portugal, before joining the Financial Times as a graduate trainee in 1998. Her roles at the newspaper included hedge fund correspondent, retail correspondent and consumer industries editor, before she became chief political correspondent in 2010 and deputy political editor in January 2013. She joined The Times in 2015 as media editor before moving to Sky News in 2016, initially as senior political correspondent, before being promoted in July 2018 to deputy political editor. In February 2019 she was appointed political editor and took up the post on 12 April 2019, replacing Faisal Islam, who had joined BBC News as economics editor.

According to the i, Rigby is known for "her trademark dark bob and red lipstick, her distinctive diction and [...] her persistent questioning of senior politicians".

In December 2020, Rigby was criticised for breaching London's tier 2 COVID-19 restrictions by attending a restaurant to celebrate the birthday of Sky presenter Kay Burley, and was taken off air until March 2021. Rigby had offered to resign over the breach, later saying, "it was potentially damaging for the channel... it had upset my colleagues, and I felt absolutely wretched about that". John Ryley, the head of Sky News, declined her offer to resign.

Following Laura Kuenssberg's announcement of her departure as BBC News' political editor, Rigby was associated with the position. Rigby presents a talk show on Thursday nights on Sky News called Beth Rigby Interviews, which launched in March 2022. According to Andrew Billen of The Times, Rigby will stay on as Sky News' political editor until at least the next general election.

Personal life
She is married to Angelo Acanfora and they have two children. Her husband worked as a graphic designer but became a stay-at-home dad in 2016. She lives in North London.

Her mother died of lung cancer at the age of 62, and her brother Alex died of thymic carcinoma at the age of 42.

References

External links
 

1976 births
living people
Alumni of Fitzwilliam College, Cambridge
Alumni of the University of London
Financial Times people
The Times journalists
Sky News newsreaders and journalists
People from Colchester